Fenfushi (Dhivehi: ފެންފުށި) is one of the inhabited islands of Ari Atoll, belonging to the Alif Dhaal Atoll administrative division.

Geography

Demography

References

Islands of the Maldives